Nefʿī (نفعى) was the pen name (Ottoman Turkish: مخلص maḫlaṣ) of an Ottoman Turkish poet and satirist whose real name was ʿÖmer (عمر) (c. 1572, Hasankale, Erzurum – 1635, Istanbul).

Biography
Nefʿī came to the Ottoman capital of Istanbul sometime before the year 1606, when he is noted to have been working in the bureaucracy as the comptroller of mines (maden mukataacısı). Nef'i attempted to gain the sultan's favor for his poetry, but was unsuccessful with Ahmed I (reigned 1603–1617) and Osman II (reigned 1618–1622). However, finally, Sultan Murad IV (reigned 1623–1640) recognized his skill and granted him a stipend.

Because of his vicious literary attacks on government officials, he was executed by strangulation in 1635 at the request of kaymakam Bayram Pasha.

Story of his execution
Turkish historian and journalist Mahmut Sami Şimşek tells the following story about the execution of Nef'i:

Nef'i's execution was decided due to his satirical verses on Grand Vizier Bayram Pasha.

As Nef'i went to Topkapı Palace to present his newly written satire book "Sihâm-ı Kazâ" to Sultan Murad IV, lightning struck the dome of the palace. The sultan ordered him away yelling "You evil! Take your book and get off so that we get rid of the arrows of misfortune".

After leaving the sultan's audience, Nef'i asked the palace master to mediate for his pardoning. The black master of African origin started to write an application to the grand vizier while Nef'i stood nearby and watched. A short while after, a drop of black ink fell onto the white paper, and Nef'i promptly commented in sarcasm "Sir, your blessed sweat dripped." The palace master tore the paper in anger, and Nef'i was delivered to the executioner. He was courageous until the last moment as he said to his executioner "Go man, you slacker!" After he was strangled with an oiled rope in the woodshed of the palace, his corpse was thrown into the sea.

The following verse became famous describing the event:

Works
Nef'i was strongly influenced by classical Persian poetry, but also developed the Turkish kaside form. In addition to odes, especially about Sultan Murad IV, Nef'i wrote sarcastic and often vitriolic verse about the failings of specific governmental officials.

Another famous verse of poet is as following:

Tahir efendi bana kelp demiş/
İltifatı bu sözde zahirdir,/
Maliki mezhebim benim zira,/
İtikadımca kelp tahirdir.

Sir Tahir called me a dog/
His compliment is manifest in this/
After all, my school is Maliki/
Indeed, dogs are clean. [according to my creed]

*Tahir means clean in Arabic.

Notes

References

This article is based in part on material from the Turkish Wikipedia.

Further reading
 

Divan poets from the Ottoman Empire
Turkish poets
Turkish satirists
1572 births
1635 deaths
Executed writers
Executed people from the Ottoman Empire
People from Pasinler
17th-century executions by the Ottoman Empire
People executed by strangulation